Nader El Sayed (born 31 December 1972) is an Egyptian retired professional footballer who played as a goalkeeper.

Club career
He was widely recognized for the first time as goalkeeper for notable Egyptian club El Zamalek. After showing some classy performances for his club, he took the chance to move to Club Brugge in the Belgian League in 1998. After failing to reserve a starting place with his team, he decided to try his luck with Akratitos in the Greek Super League.

Nader participated with Al Ahly in the 2005 FIFA Club World Championship 5th place playoff against Sydney F.C. in Tokyo, the match which Sydney won 2–1.

On 9 January 2007 it was announced that Nader transferred to ENPPI after failing to reserve a starting place in Al Ahly.

International career
He used to play for Egypt national team until 2005, where he lost his place due to his irregular participating with Al Ahly. His last national game was against Ivory Coast away, ended with a loss for guests 2–0. This match was in 2006 World Cup Qualifiers. Nader's first national game was against Jordan ended with a draw 1–1.

Nader was the Captain of Egyptian team at the 1992 Summer Olympics in Barcelona and participated in 1991 FIFA World Youth Championship in Portugal.

Also, he was the first Egyptian goalkeeper to be chosen twice as best keeper in African Cup of Nations since 1957. He had chosen in 
Burkina Faso 1998 and Ghana and Nigeria 2000 .

Honours
National Team
 Winner of African Cup of Nations Burkina Faso 1998.
 Winner of Arab Cup of Nations 1992.
 Winner of African Youth Championship 1991.

Zamalek
African Cup of Champions Clubs: 2
 1993, 1996
CAF Super Cup: 2
 1994, 1997
Egyptian League: 2
 1991–92, 1992–93
Afro-Asian Cup: 1
 1997

Ahly
 CAF Champions League 2005
 CAF Champions League 2006
 Egyptian League (2005/2006)
 Egyptian Soccer Cup (2005/2006)
 Egyptian Super Cup 2005/2006
 African Super Cup 2005.

Individual
Two times Best African goalkeeper in African Cup of Nations1998 & 2000.
Best goalkeeper in African Youth Nation Cup 1991
Best Arab goalkeeper 1992
Best Egyptian goalkeeper 1992–1998

Penalty shootouts
Nader is famous for saving penalty kicks. He saved 21 kicks in penalty shoot-outs winning many tournaments for his country and his club

See also
 List of men's footballers with 100 or more international caps

References

External links

1972 births
Living people
Zamalek SC players
Egyptian footballers
Egypt international footballers
Egyptian expatriate footballers
Egyptian expatriate sportspeople in Belgium
1999 FIFA Confederations Cup players
Olympic footballers of Egypt
Footballers at the 1992 Summer Olympics
FIFA Century Club
A.P.O. Akratitos Ano Liosia players
Association football goalkeepers
Al Masry SC players
Al Ittihad Alexandria Club players
Club Brugge KV players
Belgian Pro League players
1996 African Cup of Nations players
1998 African Cup of Nations players
2000 African Cup of Nations players
2002 African Cup of Nations players
2004 African Cup of Nations players
Expatriate footballers in Belgium
Expatriate footballers in Greece
Egyptian Premier League players
People from Dakahlia Governorate